Gene Baylos (November 16, 1906 – January 10, 2005) was a nightclub comedian. Not widely known by the general public, Baylos was a favourite of many "celebrity" comedians in New York City. A modest success on television, he performed his stand-up routine on variety shows, including The Hollywood Palace and The Joey Bishop Show. Baylos appeared with small roles on The Dick Van Dyke Show,That Girl and Car 54, Where Are You?.

He is considered a contemporary of Alan King and Milton Berle.

Baylos died at age 98 in Manhattan, of natural causes.

References

External links
Footage of the Gene Baylos stand-up act

1906 births
2005 deaths
American male comedians
Comedians from New York City
20th-century American comedians